The Wellington Phoenix 2010–11 season was the Wellington Phoenix's fourth A-League season.

Players

First team squad

1 Manny Muscat does not count to the foreign players quota as he holds Australian citizenship.

Contract extensions

Transfers

In

Out

Matches

2010–11 Pre-season friendlies

2010–11 Hyundai A-League fixtures

2010–11 Finals series

Results by round

Statistics

Appearances

Goal scorers

Goal assists

Discipline

Goal times

Home attendance

Club

Technical staff
First team Coach:  Ricki Herbert
Technical Analyst:  Luciano Trani
First team Physiotherapist:  Adam Crump
Masseur:  Dene Carroll
Strength & Conditioning Coach:  Ed Baranowski

Kit

|
|
|
|
|}

End of Season Awards
See also List of Wellington Phoenix FC End of Season Awards
Sony Player of the Year: Ben Sigmund
Members' Player of the Year: Manny Muscat
Players' Player of the Year: Manny Muscat
Media Player of the Year: Marco Rojas
Golden Boot: Chris Greenacre – 8 goals
Under-23 Player of the Year: Marco Rojas

References

External links
 A-League website
 Wellington Phoenix website

2010-11
2010–11 A-League season by team
Wellington Phoenix season